Tintumon is a joke character, the Malayali equivalent of Little Johnny. This character was created and spread like a viral phenomenon through text messages in mobile phones. Later, the popularity increased to such an extent that leading bookmakers also published books on Tintumon jokes. The character was originally created by noted cartoonist B. M. Gafoor. It is telecasted as a cartoon serial in Jeevan TV. But before that, a brat named Tintu first appeared in the 1983 film Ente Mamattukkuttiyammakku, popularising the name among Malayali diaspora.

Origin
A 3-year old girl named Tintu first appeared in the 1983 film Ente Mamattukkuttiyammakku portrayed by Shalini, which first popularized the name Tintu among Malayali diaspora. Tintumon, the character was created by cartoonist B. M. Gafoor. Though it was not popular in print, it reached the peak of popularity during the year 2009 through mobile SMS and e-mails.  Tintumon spread from mobile to mobile like a rage. SMS offers from various service providers aided Tintumon's growth. Mimicry artists have been using the character of Tintumon in various shows.  This became public after the jokes found their way into the SMS and the Internet. There were issues of copyright regarding its publication between Gafoor's BMG Group and another animation company, which led to a legal war in 2010. Later, its copyright was retained by the BMG Group, who is 2010, released an animated version of Tintumon. The animated version is also being telecast in Jeevan TV.

Character
Tintumon takes life as it comes. He is quick-witted, mostly inventive, and normally can’t stop himself from commenting on everyday issues. Although he was initially depicted as a five-year-old boy, later messages portrayed him as a grown-up. There are stories portraying him as an engineering student, police officer, doctor, lawyer, politician, movie star, priest, saint, and even burglar. Tintumon is now regarded as a specimen of Malayali life. His social status and age differences across stories. Tintumon is a pan-Keralite. The humour in his character largely comes from his original and often rational comments on life, his total disregard for others, his liberal attitude, all with a pinch of sarcasm.

Some compare Tintumon jokes to Sardarji jokes. However, while the Sardarji jokes usually portray a Sardar's comics, the Tintumon jokes are examples of Tintumon's intelligence and down to earth attitude.

Characters in Tintumon Universe
There are some repeating characters in Tintumon Jokes. They include
Thomas - Father
Amma - Mother
Appuppan - Grandfather
Dundumol - Girl friend
Pinkymol - Girl friend
Dundumon - Cousin
Jintappan - Friend
Sanjumon - Brother
Shashi - Archenemy
Minikutty - Sister
Rinku - Best friend

References

Books
 Jeena Rajan: "Tintumon Jokes (I Love You Tintu)", 
 Tintumon Jokes (Tintumonodano Kali)

Stock characters in jokes